Relations between the People's Republic of China and Poland officially began on October 5, 1949.

History

Early contacts and approaches

Contacts between Polish and Chinese people date back several centuries. In the mid-17th century, notable Polish Jesuit missionaries Michał Boym and Jan Mikołaj Smogulecki arrived to China. Boym significantly expanded the knowledge of China in Europe with his works, among which were the pioneering botany book Flora Sinensis and detailed maps of China. He also introduced Chinese medicine in Europe, including the analysis of the pulse. Smogulecki taught European mathematics and astronomy in China, and introduced logarithms to China. Both Boym and Smogulecki had contacts with the Imperial Court of China. In the 17th century, there were diplomatic approaches between the courts of John III Sobieski and Emperor Kangxi.

In the late 19th century and early 20th century, when Poland remained partitioned and occupied by neighbouring powers, thousands of Polish emigrants, including engineers, architects, doctors, teachers, many of them political refugees, settled in Manchuria (Northeast China) and greatly contributed to the foundation and development of the Chinese Eastern Railway and the city of Harbin. The founder of the city was Polish engineer Adam Szydłowski, who also was Harbin's first mayor, while the city's layout was planned by Polish engineer Stanisław Jokisz, and other Polish engineers were also responsible for its construction. Poles established a prosperous and influential community in the city, with Polish press, schools, organizations, churches (including the present-day Sacred Heart of Jesus Cathedral) and sports teams, and peacefully co-existed with the city's other ethnicities including the Chinese. Many Poles were employed at the Chinese Eastern Railway, which was managed at the time by Polish railway engineer Stanisław Kierbedź. Poles introduced sugar beet cultivation to China and established the country's first brewery, now known as the Harbin Brewery. Poles also established the first steam mills, metallurgical plants, and furniture and cigarette factories in Manchuria. Several Polish writers, including Teodor Parnicki, Edward Kajdański and Kazimierz Grochowski, either were born or spent part of their childhood or adulthood in Harbin, before eventually moving to Poland, where they popularized knowledge about China and East Asia.

Modern relations

In 1918 Poland regained independence after the partitions period, and diplomatic relations between China and Poland began in 1919, but the two countries didn't develop a strong relationship due to isolation from one another. A friendship, trade and navigation treaty between China and Poland was signed in Nanjing in 1929 to strengthen and evolve the relations. The Polish community in Harbin remained strong, until many Poles gradually left for Poland in the 1930s, and the remaining Poles were mostly repatriated to Poland by the Polish government in 1949.

Relations began on October 5, 1949, following the communist takeovers of their respective states, and diplomatic missions were established shortly after on October 7, 1949. Poland was part of the Soviet bloc and had friendly relations with China and cooperated in international issues such as the Korean war.

During the 1950s due to the Sino-Soviet split, relations between the two countries degraded. But Poland did support the People's Republic of China's case for the United Nations permanent seat to return to the mainland government.

Zhou Enlai the premier in the 1950s made two state visits to Poland. Leaders from 
Poland such as Bolesław Bierut, Edward Ochab and Józef Cyrankiewicz had visited China at various times during this period.

Poland underwent political and social change when the Soviet bloc collapsed in the late 1980s and Poland became a new post-communist country. The relationship between the two countries remain steadfast as Poland became more of a western liberal democracy with a capitalist market and China embarking on Deng Xiaoping's economic reforms.

In 2016, China's leader and general secretary of the Chinese Communist Party, Xi Jinping visited Poland, saying that "Polish companies will benefit hugely" from China's Belt and Road Initiative. Duda and Xi signed a declaration on strategic partnership in which they reiterated that Poland and China viewed each other as long-term strategic partners.

In January 2019, Huawei employee Wang Weijing was arrested in Poland on charges of spying for China.

Economic relations 
During the 1950s to 1990s, the two countries conducted economic activities using accounts on government agreements. The annual trade value nearly US$1 billion in 1986 between the two communist states.

In the 1990s, agreement on trade payments in convertible foreign exchanges were signed. Trade dipped in 1990 from US$0.322 billion to US$0.144 billion in 1991. It was until 1992 bilateral trade began to increase again.

Bilateral trade increased over the successful years. By 2001, the trade between the two countries were valued at US$1.242 billion, up 29.5% than in 2000.

China-Polish economic relations revolves around areas such as environmental protection, finance, agricultural technology, copper industry and coal mining. This also includes new areas like high technology, clean energy, labour, service and infrastructure.

In 2008, Poland's exports to China was around US$1 billion. But it imported from China around US$11 billion.

Resident diplomatic missions
 China has an embassy in Warsaw and a consulate-general in Gdańsk.
 Poland has an embassy in Beijing and consulates-general in Chengdu, Guangzhou, Hong Kong and Shanghai.

See also 
 Foreign relations of China
 Foreign relations of Poland

Additional reading 

 Diplomatic Approaches between the Court of John III Sobieski and Emperor Kangxi’s

References

External links 
Polish embassy in Beijing 
CPR embassy in Warsaw 

 
Poland
Bilateral relations of Poland